The Titan 23G, Titan II(23)G, Titan 2(23)G or Titan II SLV was an American expendable launch system derived from the LGM-25C Titan II intercontinental ballistic missile. Retired Titan II missiles were converted by Martin Marietta, into which the Glenn L. Martin Company, which built the original Titan II, had merged. It was used to carry payloads for the United States Air Force (USAF), NASA and National Oceanic and Atmospheric Administration (NOAA). Thirteen were launched from Space Launch Complex 4W (SLC-4W) at the Vandenberg Air Force Base between 1988 and 2003.

Titan 23G rockets consisted of two stages burning liquid propellant. The first stage was powered by one Aerojet LR87 engine with two combustion chambers and nozzles, and the second stage was propelled by an LR91. On some flights, the spacecraft included a kick motor, usually the Star-37XFP-ISS; however, the Star-37S was also used.

A contract to refurbish fourteen Titan II missiles to the Titan 23G configuration was awarded to Martin Marietta in January 1986. The first launch occurred on 5 September 1988, carrying a classified payload for the U.S. National Reconnaissance Office. Thirteen were launched, with the fourteenth going to the Evergreen Aviation Museum. The final flight occurred on 17 October 2003, carrying a Defense Meteorological Satellite Program (DMSP) satellite.

During refurbishment, the forward structure of the second stage was modified with the addition of a payload attachment fitting to attach the payload to the rocket, and installing a payload fairing to protect it during launch. The engines were refurbished, and the rockets' guidance and control systems were upgraded by Delco Electronics.

The former Titan IIIB pad at Vandenberg, SLC-4W, was modified to accommodate the Titan 23G, and was used for all thirteen launches.

Launch history 

All launches of Titan II(23)G rockets took place from Space Launch Complex 4W (SLC-4W) at Vandenberg Air Force Base.

A fourteenth rocket, G-10, based on Titan II B-108, but incorporating an oxygen tank from B-80, was not launched and is preserved at the Evergreen Aviation & Space Museum in McMinnville, Oregon. The remaining 42 Titan II missiles were stored at Davis-Monthan AFB with most being broken up for salvage. Four were transferred to museums.

See also
Atlas E/F
Dnepr
Minotaur I
Minotaur IV

References

Titan (rocket family)